An axiom P is independent if there are no other axioms Q such that Q implies P.

In many cases independence is desired, either to reach the conclusion of a reduced set of axioms, or to be able to replace an independent axiom to create a more concise system (for example, the parallel postulate is independent of other axioms of Euclidean geometry, and provides interesting results when negated or replaced).

Proving Independence

If the original axioms Q are not consistent, then no new axiom is independent. If they are consistent, then P can be shown independent of them if adding P to them, or adding the negation of P, both yield consistent sets of axioms.  For example, Euclid's axioms including the parallel postulate yield Euclidean geometry, and with the parallel postulate negated, yields non-Euclidean geometry. For examples, elliptic geometry (no parallels) and hyperbolic geometry (many parallels). Both elliptic and hyperbolic geometry are consistent systems, showing that the parallel postulate is independent of the other axioms.

Proving independence is often very difficult. Forcing is one commonly used technique.

References

External links 

Metalogic